Spaceland was an alternative rock/indie rock nightclub in the Silver Lake neighborhood of Los Angeles, California, that existed between 1995 and 2011. The club was formerly a popular disco to young locals called Dreams of LA. Spaceland's owner announced the end of the venue in late 2010, with the space continuing to operate under the new name The Satellite.

History
The first show ever held at Spaceland featured Beck, The Foo Fighters, Possum Dixon and Lutefisk.  The list of acts who have played Spaceland is quite long, ranging from veteran performers from the 1960s and 1970s like Arthur Lee and The Dictators to current major acts such as Supergrass, Jet, The Shore and The White Stripes. It was very important in establishing the career of Beck and the Silver Lake scene which followed in his wake.

Spaceland is considered "home" for many bands in the so-called Silver Lake "scene" over the years, including Silversun Pickups, 400 Blows, Pine Marten, Radar Bros., The 88, Biblical Proof of UFOs, Patrick Park, etc.
The club features as the setting for the fictional band Munchausen By Proxy (lead singer Zooey Deschanel) in the 2008 Jim Carrey movie Yes Man. One of the final bands to play there is the New York Dolls, where they performed a rousing rendition of Bo Diddley's Pills. Photographer Kevin McCarty, in what is described as "advocacy criticism," featured the venue of the Spaceland in a series titled The Chameleon Club. A photo of the stage of the Spaceland, and other empty gay bars, appears in José Esteban Muñoz book Cruising Utopia.

Alternative comedian Neil Hamburger held a regular show at Spaceland the last Sunday of every month, inviting both mainstream (Tom Green, Tim and Eric, Paul F. Tompkins) and obscure acts to perform with him. The show continues at the venue under its new management.

After 17 years, Spaceland came to an end in late 2010 when owner Mitchell Frank decided to open a new space that would focus more on dance and electronic music.  Frank's Spaceland Productions would continue to book shows at The Echo/Echoplex complex.  Meanwhile, the space at 1717 Silverlake Blvd continued as an indie rock venue in 2011 under the name The Satellite, with shows being booked by former Spaceland booker Jennifer Tefft.

Spaceland recordings
Spaceland Recordings occasionally published live albums recorded at the club.

Live albums
 The Drones - Live in Spaceland - February, 2007
 Liam Finn - Live in Spaceland - February 22, 2008
 Darker My Love - Mondays in Spaceland, 2006

Notable performers

 The 88 (Monday, July 22, 2002)
 The Abe Lincoln Story
 400 Blows
 Air Traffic
 The Airborne Toxic Event
 Allegro
 Arcade Fire (Tuesday, December 7, 2004)
 Arctic Monkeys
 At the Drive-In
 Amy Winehouse
 Babyland (Monday, May 5, 2003)
 Beck
  Bell Gardens (Friday, March 26, 2010) 
 Bad Poetry Minute
 Biblical Proof of UFOs (Thursday, June 20, 2002)
 Bigelf (Thursday, May 13, 2004)
 The Bravery
 Burning Brides (Monday, February 28, 2005)
 The Business Machines (Thursday, April 8, 2004)
 Cake
 Cibo Matto
 The Clientele
 Creeper Lagoon
 Damo Suzuki and Mikael Karoli
 Death Cab for Cutie
 The Decemberists
 Deftones
 Dinosaur Jr
 The Dismemberment Plan
 The Drones
 Elliott Smith
 Extra Fancy
Fastball
 Ferdinand
 Fiction Company (Sept. 19, 2010)
 Fleet Foxes
 The Fling
 Fluorescein
Fitz and the Tantrums (2009)
 Fojimoto (Wednesday, November 3, 2003)
 Foo Fighters
 Fu Manchu
 Furry Things
 The Fuzztones
 Guided by Voices
 Hopewell
 Icebird
 JJ Paradise Players Club
 James (Saturday, June 6, 2008)
 John Fahey
 Julian Casablancas (Tuesday, November 3, 2009)
 Jurassic 5
 KaitO
 The Killers
 Komeda
 Kryptonite Nixon
 Kittens for Christian (Thursday, April 8, 2004)
 Lady Gaga (Dive Bar Tour)
 Les Savy Fav
 Local Natives
 Lutefisk
 Mala Leche
 Malcolm Mooney
 Mark Ronson
 Miss Spiritual Tramp of 1948
 Modest Mouse
 Mudhoney
 Nebula
 The Negro Problem
 Neutral Milk Hotel
 Of Montreal
 Orange Goblin (Thursday, May 13, 2004)
 Or, The Whale (Friday, May 28, 2010)
 Patrick Park (Monday, January 20, 2003)
 Pine Marten (Friday, May 23, 2003)
 Pavement
 Pleasure Forever (Friday, March 1, 2002)
 Popular Girl
 Possum Dixon
 R.L Burnside
 Radar Bros. (Friday, May 23, 2003)
 Rivulets (Friday, May 23, 2003)
 George Ellias (Tuesday, June 24, 2009)
 ? and the Mysterians (August 29, 1998)
 The Raveonettes
 The Red Aunts
 The Rentals
 Rilo Kiley
 Rocket from the Crypt
 The Rogers Sisters (Monday, January 20, 2003)
 Rubyfish
 Scarling.
 Self
 Seneca Hawk
 Shiner
 The Shins
 Six Volt Sunbeam
 The Thrills (Wednesday November 7, 2007)
 Shack (Tuesday, September 26, 2003)
 Silversun Pickups (Monday, July 22, 2002)
 Skeleteen
 Soviet (August, 2003)
 The Smiths Indeed
 Snow Patrol
 Spacehog
 The Spinto Band
 Stew (musician)
 Totimoshi (Monday, May 5, 2003)
 Useless Keys
 V3
 Velouria
 Visionaries
 VLA
 Ween
 Weezer
 The White Stripes
 Will Haven (Wednesday, July 23, 2003)
 Wondermints
 Yob (Wednesday, July 23, 2003)
 Zoobombs

See also
 The Echo

References

External links
 Spaceland official website
 Spaceland on MySpace
 1995 debut show with Beck, Foo Fighters and Possum Dixon.
 Spaceland Turns 15: An Oral History
 Spaceland Interview with Mitchell Frank, regarding 1995 debut with Beck, Foo Fighters and Possum Dixon.

Music venues in Los Angeles
Nightclubs in Los Angeles County, California
Silver Lake, Los Angeles